This was the first edition of the tournament.

Polona Hercog won the title after Clara Burel withdrew before the final.

Seeds
All seeds receive a bye into the second round.

Draw

Finals

Top half

Section 1

Section 2

Bottom half

Section 3

Section 4

References

Draws

2021 ITF Women's World Tennis Tour